The Miss Perú 1998 pageant was held on April 16, 1998. That year, 20 candidates were competing for the national crown. The chosen winner represented Peru at the Miss Universe 1998. The rest of the finalists would enter in different pageants.

Placements

Special Awards

 Best Regional Costume - Huánuco - Karim Bernal
 Miss Photogenic - Amazonas - Paola Valega
 Miss Elegance - Huánuco - Karim Bernal
 Miss Body - Ica - Rosa Elvira Cartagena
 Best Hair - Arequipa - Diana Valderrama
 Miss Congeniality - Ucayali - Julissa Arana 
 Most Beautiful Face - Madre de Dios - Patricia Puch

Delegates

Amazonas - Paola Valega
Áncash - Mónica Herrera
Arequipa - Diana Valderrama 
Ayacucho - Maritza Coello
Cajamarca - Marisol Fernández
Callao - Viviana Mendoza
Cuzco - Vanessa Rojas
Huánuco - Karim Bernal
Ica - Rosa Elvira Cartagena
Junín - Laurie Ann Meyer

La Libertad - Tatiana Carbonel
Lambayeque - Gabriela León
Loreto - Úrsula Bravo
Madre de Dios - Patricia Puch
Piura - Pamela Ocampo
Puno - Farah Gadea 
Region Lima - Fabiola Chino
Tacna - Miryam del Pilar Aedo
Tumbes - Claudia Neyra
Ucayali - Julissa Arana

Judges

Luis Miguel Ciccia - Manager of Transportes CIVA
Olga Zumarán - Miss Peru 1978
Julie Freundt - Peruvian Singer
Dr. Mario Drassinower - Plastic Surgeon
Lalo Mercado - TV Presenter
Natali Sacco - Miss Perú 1996
Sol Carreño - News Anchorwoman & TV Journalist
Norka Peralta del Águila - Peruvian Designer

Background Music

Opening Show – The Verve - "Bitter Sweet Symphony"
Swimsuit Competition – James Brown - "I Feel Good"
Evening Gown Competition – Enya - "Orinoco Flow"

Special Guests Singers

La Toya Jackson - "Stop in the Name of Love" & "Don't Break My Heart"

Miss World Peru

The Miss World Peru 1998 pageant was held on June 7, 1998, That year, 24 candidates from the regions of Peru were competing for the national crown. The show host by Antonio Vodanovic and Jessica Newton were a live broadcast from Jockey Plaza Shopping Center by Panamericana Television.  The chosen winner represented Peru at Miss World 1998. The rest of the finalists would enter in different pageants.

Placements

MWP Special Awards

 Miss Photogenic - Amazonas - Ursula verastegui
 Miss Elegance - Puno - Monica Cabanillas Gamarra
 Miss Body - Lambayeque - Viviana Rivasplata
 Best Hair - Ica - Carmen Mora
 Miss Congeniality - Junín - Grace Sanchez
 Most Beautiful Face - La Libertad - Mariana Larrabure

Delegates

Amazonas - Ursula verastegui
Áncash - Carla Urrunaga
Apurímac - Maria Pia Campodonico
Arequipa - Georgia Queirolo
Ayacucho - Maria del Pilar Cossio
Cajamarca - Violeta vargas
Callao - Karina Cervera Gallegos
Cuzco - Maria del Pilar Leon
Huánuco - Marigen Rojas
Ica - Carmen Mora Marticorena
Junín - Grace Sanchez
La Libertad - Mariana Larrabure

Lambayeque - Viviana Rivasplata
Loreto - Karen Stendberg
Madre de Dios - Brenda Robles Ganoza
Moquegua - Elsa Guerra
Pasco - Edith Ghia
Piura - Milagros Pita
Puno - Monica Cabanillas Gamarra
Region Lima - Katia Rosello
San Martín - Zessy Coronado
Tacna - Melissa Miranda Quiñones
Tumbes - Guiliana Vinazza
Ucayali - Marielena Leonardi

MWP Judges

 Carlos Morales - Public Relations Manager of Grupo D' elite
 Sasha Sökol - Mexican singer, composer & actress
 Sandro Finoglio - Mr. World 1998
 Eleazar Molina - Jewel Designer
 Moon Hym Kim - Daewoo Motors Rep. Director
 Rodrigo Wood - Coca-Cola's Regional Manager
 Gustavo Teixeira - Regional Manager of Philips Electronics corp.
 Alejandra Barbosa - Reina Intl. de las Playas, America & del caribe 1997
 Dr. Cesar Morillas - Plastic Surgeon
 Ricardo Davila - Fashion Designer

References 

Miss Peru
1998 in Peru
1998 beauty pageants